Evangel University is a private Christian university and seminary in Springfield, Missouri. It is affiliated with the Assemblies of God Christian denomination, which is also headquartered in Springfield. The campus sits on  that were originally part of O'Reilly General Hospital.

History
Evangel College (later University) was founded by the General Council of the Assemblies of God in 1955 as the first national Pentecostal school of arts and sciences. The denomination, led at the time by the Rev. Ralph Riggs, already had several Bible schools and wanted a college where students entering secular fields could study in a Pentecostal, faith-based environment.
The college was established on the property of the former O'Reilly General Hospital, which had been established during World War II by the U.S. Army. In its five-year history as an Army hospital, O’Reilly served more than 100,000 patients. After the war, it briefly served as a veteran's hospital before the Army declared it excess property. The property was acquired by the Assemblies of God in December 1954 for the use of Evangel College.
 The first day of classes at Evangel was September 1, 1955. There were 87 students.
Evangel students lived and went to classes in the O'Reilly barracks for years. The first permanent structure built on campus was the Klaude Kendrick Library in 1963. In the decades since, Evangel has slowly replaced the barracks with permanent structures. The last Army barrack on campus was demolished in 2009.

Consolidation
In 2010, the Assemblies of God began an effort to consolidate Evangel University with Central Bible College and Assemblies of God Theological Seminary. All three institutions were owned by the Assemblies of God and located in Springfield, Missouri. A resolution for consolidation was passed at the Assembly of God's 2011 General Council in Phoenix, Arizona, following which efforts began to make a formal proposal to the Higher Learning Commission.

The consolidation was approved by the Higher Learning Commission in April 2013, making way for the official launch of the "new" Evangel University in August 2013. With the Higher Learning Commission's approval, the Assemblies of God also announced that Carol Taylor, president of Vanguard University in Costa Mesa, CA, had been named to lead the consolidated university. Taylor is an alumnus of Evangel University and the Assembly of God Theological Seminary. Michael Rakes became president of Evangel University in 2021.

Academics
Academic departments include Business, Behavioral and Social Sciences, Communication, Education, Humanities, Kinesiology, Music, Natural and Applied Sciences, and Theology and Church Ministries. In addition Evangel offers graduate degrees in Social Sciences, Kinesiology, and Education along with master's and doctoral degrees through Evangel's embedded seminary, the Assemblies of God Theological Seminary. This makes the total number of programs available 42 associate programs, 378 bachelors programs, 104 masters programs and 20 doctorates.

Evangel's School of Theology and Church Ministries was launched in 2013 to prepare students for vocational ministry. The new school was created with the 2013 consolidation of Evangel, Central Bible College, and Assemblies of God Theological Seminary. The three departments within the school are Bible & Theology, Church Ministries, and Intercultural Studies.

Accreditation
Evangel University is accredited by the Higher Learning Commission, whose predecessor the North Central Association of Colleges and Schools first accredited Evangel in 1965.

Evangel also has the following specialized/programmatic accreditations:
 Social Work – Council on Social Work Education
 Music – National Association of Schools of Music
 Education – Initial Teacher Preparation and Advanced Preparation Levels – National Council for Accreditation of Teacher Education

The Missouri Department of Elementary and Secondary Education issues teaching certificates to graduates who successfully complete the Teacher Education program.

Student life
Approximately 2,350 students attend Evangel University from all 50 U.S. states and 20 countries.  The university's gender distribution is 55% female and 45% male. There are more than 50 student clubs and organizations at Evangel. Each year more than 80% of Evangel students are involved in at least one campus activity outside of athletics and music.  Evangel is primarily a residential campus, with most students living in one of six residence halls: Spence Hall, Walther Hall, Scott Hall, Krause Hall, Burgess Hall or Lewis Hall. The Perkin Apartments are available for married student housing.

Athletics
The Evangel athletic teams are called the Valor (formerly known as the Crusaders). The university is a member of the National Association of Intercollegiate Athletics (NAIA), primarily competing in the Heart of America Athletic Conference (HAAC) since the 1987–88 academic year.

Evangel competes in 17 intercollegiate varsity sports: Men's sports include baseball, basketball, cross country, football, golf, soccer, tennis and track & field; while women's sports include basketball, cross country, golf, soccer, softball, tennis, track & field and volleyball; and co-ed sports include cheerleading.

In February 2022, Evangel got an invitation and accepted to join in the Kansas Collegiate Athletic Conference (KCAC) for all sports, effective beginning the 2023–24 academic year.

Club sports
The university will begin to offer club sports, effective beginning in the 2022–23 academic year, such as bass fishing, beach volleyball, bowling, crossfit and disc golf.

Facilities
 Ashcroft Center – sports: basketball, volleyball, capacity 1,200
 Baseball Complex – capacity 1,000.
 Coryell Field – sports: football, men's and woman's soccer
 Softball Complex – capacity 1,000
 Tiger Stadium – sports: football, capacity 4,400
 Baseball/Softball Fieldhouse
 Rivercut Golf Course
 Bill and Payne Stewart Golf Course

Notable alumni

Rob Berger, Founding Editor, Forbes Advisor; President, A.R. Roberts LLC
Barry Corey, President of Biola University
Vern Clark, Admiral who was 27th Chief of Naval Operations, United States Navy
Samuel Der-Yeghiayan, United States federal judge for the Northern District of Illinois
Tony Dollinger, NFL Detroit Lions running back
Sara Groves, recording artist and author
Ted Dekker, New York Times author
Jonathan Kvanvig, Professor of Philosophy, Washington University in St. Louis
Beverly Lewis, New York Times author
Troy Paino, 16th President of Truman State University
Todd Tiahrt, United States Congressman, R-Kan
George O. Wood, former General Superintendent of the Assemblies of God
Derrick Clark, former NFL fullback for the Denver Broncos and running back for the Rhine Fire of NFL Europe on a World Bowl champion team

References

External links
 
 Evangel Athletics website

 
Universities and colleges in Springfield, Missouri
Universities and colleges affiliated with the Assemblies of God
Educational institutions established in 1955
Council for Christian Colleges and Universities
1955 establishments in Missouri
Liberal arts colleges in Missouri
Private universities and colleges in Missouri